Irasalagundam is a village in Prakasam district of the Indian state of Andhra Pradesh. It is located in Konakanamittla mandal.

References

Villages in Prakasam district